Benjamin Marsden (born 16 October 1979 in Blackpool, Lancashire) is an English field hockey player who plays as a half back.

Competing for England and Great Britain at numerous tournaments, he is representing Great Britain in Field hockey at the 2008 Summer Olympics. He has 46 caps representing England and 26 caps representing Great Britain as of 11 August 2008. Since 2009 he has coached pupils of King's College School.

Notes

References
Profile at www.greatbritainhockey.co.uk

External links
 

1979 births
Living people
People educated at Dean Close School
English male field hockey players
Olympic field hockey players of Great Britain
British male field hockey players
Field hockey players at the 2006 Commonwealth Games
Field hockey players at the 2008 Summer Olympics
People from Blackpool
Wimbledon Hockey Club players
Commonwealth Games competitors for England